Ballinderreen GAA is a Gaelic Athletic Association club based in Ballinderreen, County Galway, Ireland. The club was founded in 1884. The parish already was deeply rooted in hurling before the foundation of the GAA.

The club is situated in South Galway, in the parish of Ballinderreen. The club has produced many fine hurlers throughout the years, many of whom have gone on to win All Ireland Medals with Galway.

History
The Club has little success in terms of senior championship silverware, but it has been very successful in juvenile age groups, winning many underage championships.

In 2011, the club's Junior B team won the Leinster Junior B Club hurling championship, becoming the first ever Galway team to win a Leinster championship. They reached the All-Ireland Junior B Club Hurling Championship final. They defeated Thurles Sarsfields in the semi-final before meeting Doneraile GAA in the final. They went on to win 2–6 to 0–5.

The club's senior team last advanced as far as the Galway Senior Hurling Championship county final in 1978, with Noel Lane in the attack. They met neighbours and old rivals, Ardrahan in the decider. The game was held in Ballinasloe, with the game eventually ending in a draw on a scoreline of Ballinderreen 0–16, Ardrahan 2–10. The replay was held later, with Ardrahan winning their 11th title after extra time on a scoreline of Ardrahan 2-18 Ballinderreen 2–14.

On 21 August 1991, Ballinderreen hosted a 1991–92 European Cup Winners' Cup match between
Galway United F.C. and Odense BK.

In 2000, the Ballinderreen team won the Galway Intermediate Hurling championship, beating Kiltormer in the final by 1–8 to 0–4. They returned to the senior championship after only one year in intermediate.

Notable players
Intercounty hurlers
 Noel Lane
 Mick Gill – Galway all Ireland Winner 1923
 Colin Coen – Galway Senior Hurler 2005–2006
 Joe McDonagh – Galway Senior Hurler 1972–1983, President of the GAA 1997–2000
 Tom Helebert – Galway Senior Hurler 1989–1997

Honours
 Galway Intermediate Hurling Championship (2)
 2000, 2017
 Galway Intermediate Hurling Championship runners up (1)
 2016
 Galway Senior Hurling Championship runners up (2)
 1935, 1978
 South Galway Senior Hurling Championship (14)
 1933, 1934, 1935, 1936, 1937, 1938, 1939, 1944, 1957, 1960, 1965, 1966, 1972, 1974
 South Galway Board Junior Hurling Championship (3)
 1929, 1930, 1942
 Galway Under-21 Hurling South Championship (1)
 1972
 Galway Junior B Hurling Championship (3)
 1942, 1996, 2018
 Galway Under-21 B Hurling Championship (1)
 1999
 Galway Minor Hurling Championship (3)
 (B) 1987
 (C) 1997, 2015
  U16 A1 "Championship. 2021
 Galway Under-14 B Hurling Championship (1)
 2001
 Galway Under-12 B Hurling Championship (1)
 2001
 Leinster Junior B Club Hurling Championship (1)
 2011
 All-Ireland Junior B Club Hurling Championship (1)
 2011

References

Hurling clubs in County Galway
1884 establishments in Ireland
Gaelic games clubs in County Galway